Ada Louise Huxtable (née Landman; March 14, 1921 – January 7, 2013) was an architecture critic and writer on architecture. Huxtable established architecture and urban design journalism in North America and raised the public's awareness of the urban environment.   In 1970, she was awarded the first ever Pulitzer Prize for Criticism.  In 1981, she was named a MacArthur Fellow. Architecture critic Paul Goldberger, also a Pulitzer Prize-winner (1984) for architectural criticism, said in 1996: "Before Ada Louise Huxtable, architecture was not a part of the public dialogue." "She was a great lover of cities, a great preservationist and the central planet around which every other critic revolved," said architect Robert A. M. Stern, dean of the Yale University School of Architecture.

Early life
Huxtable was born and died in New York City. She went to Hunter College in 1941 and after her graduation she studied architectural history at New York University 's Institute of Fine Arts. Ada Louise Landman received an A. B. (magna cum laude) from Hunter College, CUNY in 1941.

In 1942, she married industrial designer L. Garth Huxtable, and continued graduate study at New York University from 1942 to 1950. From 1950 to 1951 she spent one year in Italy on a scholarship of the U.S.-Italy Fulbright Commission.

Career
She served as Curatorial Assistant for Architecture and Design at the Museum of Modern Art (MoMA) in New York from 1946 to 1950. She received a Fulbright Scholarship, which enabled her to travel in Italy and research Italian architecture and engineering. Given this opportunity, she left MoMA. In 1958, she also received a Guggenheim Fellowship to research the structural and design advances of American architecture. She was a contributing editor to Progressive Architecture and Art in America from 1950 to 1963 before being named the first architecture critic at The New York Times, a post she held from 1963 to 1982. Her architectural writings were about the humanistic meaning and artistic power that also involved her displeasure for projects that were missing civic engagement. She made architecture a more prevalent part of the public dialogue by appearing on the front page of The New York Times. From 1968 to 1971, her public opinion was found so successful that it was commemorated in New Yorker cartoons.  She received grants from the Graham Foundation for a number of projects, including the book Will They Ever Finish Bruckner Boulevard?. She was elected a Fellow of the American Academy of Arts and Sciences in 1974 and a member of the American Philosophical Society in 1989.

Huxtable was the architecture critic for The Wall Street Journal, a position she held from 1997 until 2012.

John Costonis, writing of how public aesthetics is shaped, used her as a prime example of an influential media critic, remarking that "the continuing barrage fired from [her] Sunday column... had New York developers, politicians, and bureaucrats, ducking for years." He reproduces a cartoon in which construction workers, at the base of a building site with a foundation and a few girders lament that "Ada Louise Huxtable already doesn't like it!"

Carter Wiseman wrote, "Huxtable's insistence on intellectual rigor and high design standards made her the conscience of the national architectural community."

She wrote over ten books on architecture, including a 2004 biography of Frank Lloyd Wright for the Penguin Lives series. She was credited as one of the main forces behind the founding of the New York City Landmarks Preservation Commission in 1965. At the same time, she was a severe critic of addressing the city's past, writing in 1968: 
Nothing beats keeping the old city where it belongs and where its ghosts are at home. [But] please, gentlemen, no horse-drawn cars, no costumes, no wigs, no stage sets, no cute-old stores, no 're-creations' that never were, no phony little-old-New York.... That is perversion, not preservation.

Huxtable's oral biography, by Lynn Gilbert, is included in Particular Passions: Talk With Women Who Shaped Our Times.

Through the years, she became such an important figure for the architectural world that she was invited to be involved in numerous juries and committees. For example, she served as a juror for the Pritzker Architecture Prize and Preamium Imperiale of Japan. She was also a member on the Architectural Selection and Building Design Committees for the Getty Center, Getty Villa and more.

Archive
In 2013, the Getty Research Institute announced its acquisition of the Huxtable archive, which spans 1921 through 2013 and includes 93 boxes and 19 file drawers of Huxtable's manuscripts and typescripts, reports, correspondence, and documents, as well as research files full of notes, clippings, photocopies, and, most notably, original photographs of architecture and design by contemporary photographers.

Publications

 Goodbye History, Hello Hamburger: An Anthology of Architectural Delights and Disasters (1986) 
 Architecture, Anyone? Cautionary Tales of the Building Art (1988) 
 Kicked A Building Lately? (1989)  (first published in 1976)
 Will They Ever Finish Bruckner Boulevard?, a collection of material appearing in The New York Times (1989)
 The Tall Building Artistically Reconsidered, a history of the skyscraper (1993) 
 The Unreal America: Architecture and Illusion (1999) 
 On Architecture: Collected Reflections on a Century of Change (2008) 
 Frank Lloyd Wright: A Life (2008)

References

External links
 Pioneering Women of American Architecture, Ada Louise Huxtable
 Tribute to Ada Louise Huxtable, a speech by Paul Goldberger, architecture critic for The New Yorker.
 Huxtable interviewed on Charlie Rose
 Obituary (German) in Berliner Zeitung by Nikolaus Bernau
 Finding aid for the Ada Louise Huxtable papers at the Getty Research Institute.
 Finding aid for the L. Garth Huxtable papers, 1913-2012 at the Getty Research Institute.

American architecture critics
Pulitzer Prize for Criticism winners
Critics employed by The New York Times
The New York Times Pulitzer Prize winners
The Wall Street Journal people
Fellows of the American Academy of Arts and Sciences
People associated with the Museum of Modern Art (New York City)
American curators
American women curators
Historical preservationists
American biographers
MacArthur Fellows
Hunter College alumni
New York University alumni
Deaths from cancer in New York (state)
1921 births
2013 deaths
American women biographers
Writers from New York City
Members of the American Philosophical Society
Members of the American Academy of Arts and Letters